Lekë Zaharia (? – 1444), was an Albanian nobleman from Zaharia family. He was the only son of his father Koja Zaharia and mother Bosa who also had one daughter, Bolja, who named her son Koja after her father.

League of Lezhë 

In 1444 he was one of the founders of League of Lezhë which included some other members of  Albanian nobility:
 Lekë Zaharia (lord of Sati and Dagnum) and his vassals Pal Dukagjin and Nikolla Dukagjini
 Pjetër Spani
 Lekë Dushmani
 Gjergj Stres Balsha with John and Gojko Balsha
 Andrea Thopia with nis nephew Tanush Thopia
 Gjergj Arianiti Thopia Comneni
 Theodor Korona Muzaka 
 Stefan Crnojević with his sons

Leke's murder 
According to Marin Barleti , in 1445 during the ceremony of the marriage of Skanderbeg sister Mamica Kastrioti, he had a dispute with Lekë Dukagjini. The reason of this dispute was a woman named Irene Dushmani, the heir of Dushmani family. She seemed to prefer Zaharia, while this was not accepted by Dukagjini. A skirmish happened and Lekë Dukagjini remained wounded, saved only by the intervention of Vrana Konti. Two years later, in 1447, Lekë Zaharia was killed in an ambush and Lekë Dukagjini was accused for this murder.

Original Venetian documents show that this murder happened in 1444. According to Venetian chronicler Stefano Magno it was Nicholas Dukagjin, Zaharia's vassal, who killed Lekë Zaharia in the battle, not Lekë as stated by Marin Barleti. Stefano Magno also stated that, before he died, Lekë Zaharia expressed his wish that his properties should be handed over to Venetian Republic.

Aftermath 
Having left no heirs, the fortress of Dagnum was claimed from Skanderbeg in the name of League of Lezhë, whose Lekë Zaharia was a participant. However, his mother surrendered the castle to the Venice Republic. This events triggered the Albanian Venetian war which lasted two years. In the end the castle of Dagnum remained in Venetian hands toward an annual tribute to Skanderbeg.

Family tree

References

Leke
15th-century Albanian people
Albanian Roman Catholics
Year of birth missing
Assassinated Albanian people
1447 deaths